Sohbatabad may refer to:
Sohbatabad, Alborz
Sohbatabad, Kermanshah
Sohbatabad, Lorestan